Tallinn Music School (or Tallinn School of Music) may refer to:
 Georg Ots Tallinn Music College, bore the name "Tallinn Music School" between 1949 and 1975
 Tallinn Music School (1991), before 1991 bore the name Tallinn Children's Music School